Rude Britain (subtitled 100 Rudest Place Names in Britain) is a 2005 book of British place names with seemingly rude or offensive meanings.  The book is written by Rob Bailey and Ed Hurst, and published in the United Kingdom by the Pan Macmillan imprint Boxtree.

Each of the 100 names chosen by the authors is accompanied by a photograph and a placename etymology.  The etymologies are often due to Great Britain's history of repeated invasion, occupation, and assimilation, combined with a human predilection for double entendres.

Entries include North Piddle (from the Old English word , meaning marsh), Pratt's Bottom, Ugley, Titty Ho, and Spital-in-the-Street (a hamlet in Lincolnshire with a name based on the Middle English , meaning hospital).

References

External links 
 Publisher's summary of the book

2005 non-fiction books
British toponymy
British humour
Lists of United Kingdom placename etymology
Travel guide books
Slang
British books